Giuffre or Giuffrè is a surname. Notable people with the surname include:

Aldo Giuffrè (1924–2010), Italian film actor and comedian who appeared in over 90 films
Antonino Giuffrè (born 1945), Italian mafioso from Caccamo, Palermo, Sicily
Carlo Giuffrè (1928–2018), Italian film actor
Gaetano Giuffrè (1918–2018), Italian-Greek composer
Jimmy Giuffre (1921–2008), American jazz composer, arranger, saxophone and clarinet player
Matthew Giuffre (born 1982), Canadian squash player
Virginia Giuffre, an American-Australian woman who accused Jeffrey Epstein and his associates of rape

See also